The 1985 World Table Tennis Championships mixed doubles was the 38th edition of the mixed doubles championship.  

Cai Zhenhua and Cao Yanhua defeated Jindřich Panský and Marie Hrachová in the final by two sets to one.

Results

See also
List of World Table Tennis Championships medalists

References

-